Khatib MRT station is an above-ground Mass Rapid Transit (MRT) station on the North South line (NSL) in Yishun, Singapore.

The station is located at the junction of Yishun Ring Road and Yishun Avenue 2, and is one of the two stations that currently serve Yishun New Town; the other being Yishun station. The section of tracks between this station and Yio Chu Kang station is the longest between any two stations on the MRT network.

History

Formerly named Nee Soon South, it was renamed to Khatib in January 1987 after Sungei Khatib Bongsu, a river nearby, and a military base nearby, along with Yishun station which was initially named Nee Soon. In 1990, there was a power failure which occurred at Yishun station, affecting services at this station.

After several successful tests at the Jurong East, Yishun and Pasir Ris stations, installation of the half-height screen doors started and operations commenced on 30 September 2011. The station was installed with high-volume low-speed fans, which began operations since 28 August 2012.

As part of efforts to improve overall accessibility of public transport, the overhead pedestrian bridge near Khatib and other stations (Aljunied, Bishan, Sengkang, Kranji and Yew Tee) have lifts installed to improve barrier free accessibility to major transport nodes. The lifts were installed progressively, from the first quarter of 2013, with all completed by end 2013. Khatib station was also the first batch of ten stations to have additional bicycle parking facilities under a National Cycling Plan announced in 2010.

Notes and references

Notes

References

External links
 

Railway stations in Singapore opened in 1988
Yishun
Mass Rapid Transit (Singapore) stations